The Catholic-National Conservative Party in Bohemia, was a Czech catholic political party in Bohemia. Party was founded by former members of the Party of Catholic People around Jan Dostálek. Party operated in close relationship as a counterpart of the Catholic-National Conservative Party in Moravia. On political congress on 5–6 January 1919, party merged into newly established Czechoslovak People's Party.

References

Political parties established in 1911
Political parties disestablished in 1919
Catholic political parties
Political parties in Austria-Hungary
Defunct Christian political parties
KDU-ČSL
Defunct political parties in the Czech Republic